The AF-S DX Zoom-Nikkor 10-24mm 3.5-4.5G ED is a lens manufactured by Nikon for use on Nikon DX format digital SLR cameras. It provides an angle of view on a DX format camera similar to that of a 15-35mm lens on a 135 film format camera.

Introduction 

Nikon announced the lens on 14 April 2009, its predecessor was the Nikon AF-S DX Zoom-Nikkor 12-24mm f/4G IF-ED.

Features 

 10-24mm focal length (approximately equivalent to a 15-35mm lens used on a 135 film format camera)
 Compact silent-wave autofocus motor (SWM) with full-time manual override
 Nikon F-mount lens exclusively for use with Nikon DX format DSLRs
 Extra-low Dispersion (ED) glass elements to reduce chromatic aberration
 Aspherical elements to reduce distortion
 Super integrated coating (SIC) to reduce flare and ghosts
 Internal focusing (IF)

Construction 

 fourteen lens elements in seven groups
 three aspherical elements
 two ED glass elements

See also 
 List of Nikon compatible lenses with integrated autofocus-motor

References 

Camera lenses introduced in 2009
Nikon F-mount lenses